Volodymyrivka may refer to the following places in Ukraine:

Crimea
 Volodymyrivka, Bilohirsk Raion, Crimea, village in Bilohirsk Raion
 Volodymyrivka, Chornomorske Raion, Crimea, village in Chornomorske Raion
 Volodymyrivka, Saky Raion, Crimea, village in Saky Raion

Donetsk Oblast
 Volodymyrivka, Bakhmut Raion, Donetsk Oblast, village in Bakhmut Raion
 Volodymyrivka, Pokrovsk Raion, Donetsk Oblast, village in Pokrovsk Raion
 Volodymyrivka, Volnovakha Raion, Donetsk Oblast, urban-type settlement in Volnovakha Raion

Kirovohrad Oblast
 Volodymyrivka, Holovanivsk Raion, Kirovohrad Oblast, village in Holovanivsk Raion
 Volodymyrivka (excavation site), archaeological site in the above village
 Volodymyrivka, Katerynivka rural hromada, Kropyvnytskyi Raion, Kirovohrad Oblast, village in Katerynivka rural hromada, Kropyvnytskyi Raion
 Volodymyrivka, Kompaniivka settlement hromada, Kropyvnytskyi Raion, Kirovohrad Oblast, village in Kompaniivka settlement hromada, Kropyvnytskyi Raion
 Volodymyrivka, Subottsi rural hromada, Kropyvnytskyi Raion, Kirovohrad Oblast, village in Subottsi rural hromada, Kropyvnytskyi Raion
 Volodymyrivka, Novoukrainka Raion, Kirovohrad Oblast, village in Novoukrainka Raion
 Volodymyrivka, Oleksandriia Raion, Kirovohrad Oblast, village in Oleksandriia Raion

Luhansk Oblast
 Volodymyrivka, Luhansk Oblast, village in Svatove Raion

Zhytomyr Oblast
 Volodymyrivka, Baranivka urban hromada, Zviahel Raion, Zhytomyr Oblast, village in Baranivka urban hromada, Zviahel Raion
 Volodymyrivka, Yemilchyne settlement hromada, Zviahel Raion, Zhytomyr Oblast, village in Yemilchyne settlement hromada, Zviahel Raion

See also
 :uk:Володимирівка, a more extensive list in Ukrainian Wiki